Purpurcapsula exigua is a species of small sea snail, a marine gastropod mollusk in the family Triviidae, the false cowries or trivias.

Description

Distribution
This species is distributed in the Red Sea and in the Indian Ocean along the Mascarene Basin

References

- Dautzenberg, Ph.; Bouge, J.-L. (1933). Les mollusques testacés marins des établissements Français de l'Océanie. J. Conchyl. 77(2): 41-108; 145-326; 351-469
 Drivas, J. & M. Jay (1988). Coquillages de La Réunion et de l'île Maurice
 Rosenberg, G. 1992. Encyclopedia of Seashells. Dorset: New York. 224 pp. page(s): 73
 Fehse D. (2002) Beiträge zur Kenntnis der Triviidae (Mollusca: Gastropoda) V. Kritische Beurteilung der Genera und Beschreibung einer neuen Art der Gattung Semitrivia Cossmann, 1903. Acta Conchyliorum 6: 3-48. page(s): 28

Triviidae
Gastropods described in 1831
Taxa named by John Edward Gray